The Pyrenean Ecology Institute, is a Spanish research institute. It was founded in 1942 and is the oldest Aragonese institute in the Spanish National Research Council. 

It has two offices, one in Jaca and the other in Zaragoza.

The institute also curates a herbarium of flora from the Aragonese mountains.

See also 
 Digital.CSIC - Official online open access repository of the  CSIC

References 

Scientific organisations based in Spain
Environmental research institutes
1942 establishments in Spain
Organizations established in 1942